Pam DeLissio is an American politician from the U.S. commonwealth of Pennsylvania. A member of the Democratic Party, she is a member of the Pennsylvania House of Representatives for the 194th district, representing parts of Philadelphia and Lower Merion Township.

References

External links

State Representative Pamela DeLissio official caucus site
Pamela DeLissio (D) official PA House site

Living people
Democratic Party members of the Pennsylvania House of Representatives
Pennsylvania State University alumni
21st-century American politicians
1956 births